Mohamed Maleeh Jamal (މުޙައްމަދު މަލީޙް ޖަމާލް) is a Maldivian politician.

Life 
Born on the island of Fuvahmulah, Maleeh is a Fulbright scholar who graduated from the Rochester Institute of Technology (RIT). Throughout his political career, he has worked with various political parties, including the Progressive Party of Maldives (PPM) and the Jumhooree Party (JP). Recently, he returned to PPM.

Maleeh began his political career with the Progressive Party of Maldives (PPM) and later joined the Jumhooree Party (JP). He was appointed as the Minister of Youth from 2013 to 2015, during President Yaameen's administration. He later served as the Minister of Technology and Science from 2018 to 2021, during the administration of President Ibrahim Mohamed Solih.

References

Government ministers of the Maldives
21st-century Maldivian politicians
Rochester Institute of Technology alumni
Living people
1978 births